Christopher Adamson (born 23 October 1991), better known by his stage name Vanity Milan, is a British drag queen best known for competing on the third series of RuPaul's Drag Race UK. He competed on Canada's Drag Race: Canada vs. the World in 2022.

Early life 
Adamson is British Jamaican and grew up in Mitcham, South London.

Career 
Adamson started doing drag in London in 2019. That year, he won a competition called "The Crown" hosted by Kitty Scott-Claus. His drag name comes from his mother calling him vain and his love of fashion. His husband makes his costumes.

In 2021, Vanity Milan competed on series three of RuPaul's Drag Race UK. While on the show, Vanity Milan recorded the song "BDE," for which she won a challenge. She also won three lip syncs, tying with Series 2 contestant Tayce for the most lip syncs won on RuPaul's Drag Race UK. Vanity Milan was eliminated in the ninth episode of the series, finishing in fourth place. Since the show, Vanity Milan has commented on the lack of diversity on RuPaul's Drag Race UK.

In 2022, Vanity Milan released her debut single "Miss Milan (Don't Play With Me)" and a second single titled "Pissed". She was also featured in the music video for Cheryl Hole's debut single "Need the Power".

In June 2022, Vanity Milan was featured alongside Kitty Scott-Claus on an episode of Pointless Celebrities.

In October 2022, Vanity Milan was announced as a contestant on Canada's Drag Race: Canada vs. the World. While on the show, she recorded the song "Bonjour, Hi," for which she won the first challenge and lip sync. Milan was eliminated in the fifth episode of the series, placing fifth overall.

Personal life 
In 2011, Adamson moved to Estonia, where he lived for five years. While there, he met his husband Siim Adamson, who is an Estonian citizen.

Discography

Singles

Featured singles

Filmography

References 

1991 births
Living people
20th-century LGBT people
21st-century LGBT people
British people of Jamaican descent
English drag queens
Gay entertainers
LGBT Black British people
People from Mitcham
Vanity Milan